This is a worldwide list of notable coffee companies that roast or distribute coffee.

List

See also

 List of coffeehouse chains

References

External links

 

Lists of companies by industry
Coffee organizations